The 1999 Rugby World Cup was the fourth Rugby World Cup, the quadrennial international rugby union championship. It was principally hosted by Wales, and was won by Australia. This was the first Rugby World Cup to be held in the sport's professional era.

Although the majority of matches were played outside Wales (shared between England, France, Scotland and Ireland) the opening ceremony, the first match and the final were held in Cardiff.

Four automatic qualification places were available for the 1999 tournament; Wales qualified automatically as hosts, and the other three places went to the top three teams from the previous World Cup in 1995: champions South Africa, runners-up New Zealand and third-placed France. Qualification for the final 16 places took place between 63 other nations.

The tournament was expanded to 20 teams (from 16), divided into five pools of four teams, a scenario that necessitated a quarter-final play-off round involving the five runners-up and best third-placed team to decide who would join the pool winners in the last eight. The 1999 tournament saw the introduction of a repechage, effectively a second chance for teams that had finished runners-up in each qualifying zone. Uruguay and Tonga were the first nations to profit from the repechage, and took their places alongside fellow qualifiers Australia, England, Ireland, Scotland, Italy, Argentina, Fiji, Samoa, Romania, Canada, Namibia, Japan, Spain and the United States.

The tournament began with the opening ceremony in the newly built Millennium Stadium, with Wales beating Argentina 23–18, and Colin Charvis scoring the first try of the tournament. Australia won the tournament, becoming the first nation to do so twice and also to date the only team ever to win after having to qualify for the tournament, with a 35–12 triumph over France, who were unable to repeat their semi-final victory over pre-tournament favourites New Zealand.

The overall attendance for the tournament was 1.75 million.

Qualifying

The following 20 teams, shown by region, qualified for the 1999 Rugby World Cup. Of the 20 teams, only four of those places were automatically allocated and did not have to play any qualification matches. These went to the champions, runners-up and the third-placed nations at the 1995 and the tournament host, Wales. A record 65 nations from five continents were therefore involved in the qualification process designed to fill the remaining 16 spots.

Venues

Wales won the right to host the World Cup in 1999. The centrepiece venue for the tournament was the Millennium Stadium, built on the site of the old National Stadium at Cardiff Arms Park at a cost of £126 million from Lottery money and private investment. Other venues in Wales were the Racecourse Ground and Stradey Park. An agreement was reached so that the other unions in the Five Nations Championship (England, France, Ireland and Scotland) also hosted matches.

Venues in England included Twickenham Stadium and Welford Road Stadium, rugby union venues, as well as Ashton Gate Stadium in Bristol and the McAlpine Stadium in Huddersfield, which normally host football. Scottish venues included Murrayfield Stadium, the home of the Scottish Rugby Union; Hampden Park, the home of the Scottish Football Association; and the smallest venue in the 1999 tournament, Netherdale, in Galashiels, in the Scottish Borders. Venues in Ireland included Lansdowne Road, the traditional home of the Irish Rugby Football Union; Ravenhill Stadium; and Thomond Park. France used five venues, the most of any nation, including the French national stadium, Stade de France, which hosted the final of both the 1998 FIFA World Cup and the 2007 Rugby World Cup.

Pools and format

With the expansion of the Rugby World Cup from 16 to 20 teams an unusual and complex format was used with the teams split into five pools of four teams with each team playing each other in their pool once.
Pool A was played in Scotland
Pool B was played in England
Pool C was played in France
Pool D was played in the principal host nation Wales
Pool E was played in Ireland

Points system

The points system that was used in the pool stage was unchanged from both 1991 and 1995:
3 points for a win
2 points for a draw
1 point for playing

The five pool winners qualified automatically to the quarter-finals. The five pool runners-up and the best third-placed side qualified for the quarter-final play-offs.

Knock-out stage

The five pool runners-up and the best third-placed team from the pool stage (which was Argentina) contested the quarter-final play-offs in three one-off matches that decided the remaining three places in the quarter-finals, with the losers being eliminated. The unusual format meant that two pool winners in the quarter-finals would have to play each other. From the quarter-final stage it became a simple knockout tournament. The semi-final losers played off for third place. The draw and format for the knock-out stage was set as follows.

Quarter-final play-offs draw

Match H: Pool B runner-up v Pool C runner-up
Match G: Pool A runner-up v Pool D runner-up
Match F: Pool E runner-up v Best third-placed team

Quarter-finals draw

Match M: Pool D winners v Pool E winners
Match J: Pool A winners v Play-off H winners
Match L: Pool C winners v Play-off F winners
Match K: Pool B winners v Play-off G winners

Semi-finals draw

Match J winners v Match M winners
Match L winners v Match K winners

A total of 41 matches (30 pool stage and 11 knock-out) were played throughout the tournament over 35 days from 1 October 1999 to 6 November 1999.

Squads

Referees

Pool stage
The tournament began on 1 October 1999 in the newly built Millennium Stadium in Cardiff, with Wales beating Argentina in a hard-fought game 23–18 to get their campaign off to a positive start. The Pool stage of the tournament played out as was widely expected with the Tri Nations teams of New Zealand (who inflected a massive 101–3 win against Italy at the McAlpine Stadium in Huddersfield), South Africa and Australia all winning their pools easily without losing a single game. For the then Five Nations Championship teams who all played their pool matches in their own countries it was a case of mixed fortunes with France winning their pool without losing a game. Host Wales also won their pool, though they suffered 31–38 defeat at the hands of Samoa in front of a home crowd at the Millennium Stadium. However, as expected England, Ireland and Scotland all finished second in their pools and were forced to try to qualify for the quarter-finals via the play-offs alongside fellow runners-up Samoa and Fiji, and Argentina as the best third placed side from all five pools, having been the only third-placed side to win two matches (against Samoa and Japan). Indeed, Argentina had finished level with Wales and Samoa on 7 points each in the group stages, and could only be separated by "total points scored": playing and winning their final match against Japan, they had the chance to overtake either of Samoa or Wales, but were 14 points short of overtaking Samoa's total score and a further 18 points short of Wales.

Pool A

Pool B

Pool C

Pool D

Pool E

Ranking of third-placed teams

Play-off stage
The quarter-final play-offs were three one-off knock-out matches between the runners-up of each pool and the best third-placed side from all five pools to decide the remaining three places in the quarter-finals. The matches were played in mid-week between the completion of the pool stage and the start of the quarter-finals. The matches produced fairly easy wins for England, beating Fiji 45–24, and also for Scotland, beating Samoa 35–20. However, the final match produced the shock of the round where Argentina upset Ireland 28–24 in Lens.

Quarter-final play-offs

Knockout stage
The winners from the quarter-final play-offs, who had played in mid-week, joined the pool winners, who had enjoyed a week long rest, in the quarter-finals. England, hosts Wales and Scotland were all knocked out, and France, who beat Argentina, were the only team left from the Northern Hemisphere.

The semi-finals, which were both played at Twickenham Stadium, produced two of the most dramatic matches of the tournament, with Australia beating South Africa 27–21 in extra-time after normal time ended with the scores locked at 18-18. The second semi-final between favourites New Zealand and underdogs France was an all-time classic, as France overturned a 24–10 half-time deficit to win 43–31 and reach their second World Cup final. France and Australia met at the Millennium Stadium on 6 November 1999, with Australia winning 35–12 to become the first team to win the Webb Ellis Cup twice. The cup was presented by Queen Elizabeth II to Australian captain John Eales.

The overall attendance for the tournament was 1.75 million.

Quarter-finals

Semi-finals

Third-place play-off

Final

Statistics

The tournament's top point scorer was Argentina's Gonzalo Quesada, who scored 102 points. Jonah Lomu scored the most tries, eight in total, a rugby world cup record.

Broadcasting
British television rights holders ITV acted as the host broadcaster for the tournament, with coverage shown in 209 countries, to an audience of 3.1 billion viewers. In Australia, the event was broadcast by Seven Network.

Broadcast UK history
ITV (1 October 1999 – 6 November 1999)
S4C (1 October 1999 – 6 November 1999)

Notes

References

External links

Rugbyworldcup.com
1999 Rugby World Cup Reports and Statistics (Archived)
1999 Rugby World Cup  on Worldcupweb.com
Statistics on ESPN Scrum

 
International rugby union competitions hosted by England
International rugby union competitions hosted by France
International rugby union competitions hosted by Ireland
International rugby union competitions hosted by Scotland
International rugby union competitions hosted by Wales
1999
1999 rugby union tournaments for national teams
1999–2000 in French rugby union
1999–2000 in English rugby union
1999–2000 in Irish rugby union
1999–2000 in Scottish rugby union
1999–2000 in Welsh rugby union
Rugby
Rugby